Baron Sydney (an alternative spelling of the surname Sidney) was a title that was created three times in British history. The title was later elevated twice into a viscounty, and from there, once more into an earldom.

First creation (1603)
The first creation came in the Peerage of England in 1603 when Robert Sidney was made Baron Sydney, of Penshurst. In 1618, he was also granted the recreated title of Earl of Leicester.

List of Barons Sydney (first creation) 
Robert Sidney, 1st Earl of Leicester (1563–1626)
Robert Sidney, 2nd Earl of Leicester (1595–1677)
Philip Sidney, 3rd Earl of Leicester (1619–1698)

In 1689, the barony was elevated to a viscountcy and granted to Henry Sydney, 1st Earl of Romney (younger brother of the 3rd Earl of Leicester).

Second creation (1768)
The second creation came in 1768 when Dudley Cosby (–1774), Minister Plenipotentiary to Denmark between 1763 and 1765, was made Baron Sydney, of Stradbally in the Queen's County, in the Peerage of Ireland. He was the grandson and namesake of Dudley Cosby, who represented the Queen's County in the Irish House of Commons, and the great-nephew of William Cosby. This creation, however, soon became extinct on Sydney's death in 1774.

Third creation (1783)
The third creation came on 6 March 1783 when Thomas Townshend was created Baron Sydney, of Chiselhurst in the County of Kent, in the Peerage of Great Britain, and entered the House of Lords. He was soon elevated to Viscount Sydney of Chislehurst on 11 June 1789, and his grandson was eventually created Earl Sydney in 1874.

References

External links 

 Dudley Alexander Sydney Cosby, Baron Sydney at the National Gallery

Extinct baronies in the Peerage of Ireland
Extinct baronies in the Peerage of Great Britain
Extinct baronies in the Peerage of England
Noble titles created in 1603
Noble titles created in 1768
Noble titles created in 1783